Javad Molania (born 1978) is an Iranian actor, director, presenter, photographer and painter. He is best known for his adaptations of European plays.

Works

Director
A Doll's House
Le Malentendu
Amadeus
Horatio

Actor
Tweezers(2005)
Here Tonight (2019)
Horatio

Cinematographer
Melody of Cradle (2013)

References

1978 births
Living people
Iranian directors
Iranian male actors
Iranian painters
Iranian television presenters
Iranian radio presenters
Iranian photographers